The 1996 Vermont gubernatorial election took place on November 5, 1996. Incumbent Democrat Howard Dean ran successfully for re-election to a third full term as Governor of Vermont, defeating Republican nominee John L. Gropper.

Democratic primary

Results

Republican primary

Results

Liberty Union primary

Results

General election

Results

See also
 1996 United States House of Representatives election in Vermont
 1996 United States presidential election in Vermont

References

Vermont
1996
Howard Dean